Gowmazi Saleh (also Romanized as Gowmāzī Şāleḩ; also known as Gūmāzī) is a village in Kambel-e Soleyman Rural District, in the Central District of Chabahar County, Sistan and Baluchestan Province, Iran. At the 2006 census, its population was 145, in 28 families.

References 

Populated places in Chabahar County